Michael Óg McFadden (1885 – 27 August 1958) was an Irish Fine Gael politician. A merchant and auctioneer, he was first elected to Dáil Éireann as a Cumann na nGaedheal Teachta Dála (TD) for the Donegal constituency at the June 1927 general election. He was re-elected at the September 1927 general election but lost his seat at the 1932 general election. 

He re-gained his seat at the 1933 general election and was re-elected at each subsequent election until he lost his seat again at the 1951 general election. From the 1937 general election, he was elected for the Donegal West constituency. At the 1951 Seanad election, he was elected to the 7th Seanad on the Agricultural Panel. He lost his seat at the 1954 Seanad election.

References

1885 births
1958 deaths
Cumann na nGaedheal TDs
Fine Gael TDs
Members of the 5th Dáil
Members of the 6th Dáil
Members of the 8th Dáil
Members of the 9th Dáil
Members of the 10th Dáil
Members of the 11th Dáil
Members of the 12th Dáil
Members of the 13th Dáil
Members of the 7th Seanad
Politicians from County Donegal
Fine Gael senators